American National Standard C2 is the American National Standards Institute (ANSI) standard for the National Electrical Safety Code (NESC), published by the Institute of Electrical and Electronics Engineers (IEEE).

The NESC is a document containing voluntary (unless adopted by law) standards for safeguarding persons against electrical hazards during the installation, operation and maintenance of electric supply and communication lines.   It includes general updates and critical revisions that directly impact the power utility industry. Adopted by law by the majority of states and Public Service Commissions across the US, the NESC is a performance code considered to be the authoritative source on good electrical engineering practice.

See also
 IEC 60364
 National Electrical Safety Code
 Canadian Electrical Code
 PSE law, Japan Electrical Safety Law.
 Slash rating
 Central Electricity Authority Regulations

References 

 IEEE Standards Association

C2
Electrical safety
Electrical wiring
Safety codes